Iida (written: 飯田) is a Japanese surname. Notable people with the surname include:

, Japanese racing driver
, Japanese film actress
, Japanese film and television director, screenwriter, manga author, and novelist
, Japanese singer and artist
, Japanese footballer
Koichi Iida ((飯田 鴻一, 18881973), Japanese businessman
, Japanese football referee
, Japanese footballer
, Japanese singer and actress
, Japanese voice actress and singer
, general in the Imperial Japanese Army in World War II
, Japanese footballer
, Japanese photographer
, director of the Institute for Sustainable Energy Policies in Japan
, former Nippon Professional Baseball outfielder
, former Nippon Professional Baseball first baseman and manager; inducted into the Japanese Baseball Hall of Fame
, director of the anime series Hellsing

Fictional characters
, a character in the manga and anime series My Hero Academia
, a character in the manga and anime series My Hero Academia

Japanese-language surnames